Back by Popular Demand is an album by the American rap musician Kurtis Blow, released in 1988. It was his final studio album.

The album peaked at No. 84 on Billboard'''s Top Black Albums.

Production
Blow sang on the remake of Charles Wright & the Watts 103rd Street Rhythm Band's "Express Yourself". Salaam Remi helped to produce a few tracks on the album.

Critical receptionTrouser Press wrote that the album "finds the venerable but passé rapper in an understandably insecure mood, circling his wagons in a vain attempt to get with the new hip-hop generation." The Orlando Sentinel opined that "by the time Blow gets through the first side of the LP, he's delivered three songs that do little more than brag that he's the greatest rapper since the dawn of time, etc ... Yawn."

The Omaha World-Herald praised the album's "melodic tunes": "Express Yourself", "Love Don't Love Nobody", "Feeling Good", and "Blue Iguana".

AllMusic wrote: "The first track and initial single has Blow putting himself on the ropes and the defensive as he proclaims his return, but he never really went anywhere. The song, like the majority of this effort, employs a harder, James Brown sample-laden sound." MusicHound R&B: The Essential Album Guide'' deemed the album "stale-sounding."

Track listing

References

Kurtis Blow albums
1988 albums
Mercury Records albums